Matigsalug (Matig-Salug Manobo) is a Manobo language of Mindanao in the Philippines. It belongs to the Austronesian language family.

Distribution and dialects
There are approximately at least 50,000 speakers of the language, most of whom are concentrated in Mindanao, notably in south central Bukidnon, north-northeastern Cotabato and northwestern Davao del Sur provinces. A total of 5,000 monolingual speakers of the language has been reported.

Matigsalug can be divided into four major dialects: Kulamanen, Tigwa, Tala Ingod, and Matigsalug Proper. Dialects are divergent, such that Tigwa has marginal intelligibility of Matigsalug, and only Tala Ingod may have adequate intelligibility of Matigsalug.

Writing system
Matigsalug is typically written using eighteen graphemes: a, b, d, e, g, h, i, k, l, m, n, p, r, s, t, u, w, and y. The graphemes c, f, j, o, q, v, x, and z are used in recently borrowed words and the names of people and places. The glottal stop is represented by a hyphen when it occurs word medially, but not where it occurs intervocalically.

Phonology

Vowels
Matigsalug has four vowels: .

Long vowels do occur in Matigsalug, albeit rarely. The orthographic convention for long vowels is to write two vowel segments. This is in contrast with the spelling convention of most other Philippine languages, where sequences of identical vowels are separated by a glottal stop, e.g. Tagalog .

Consonants

There are 14 Matigsalug consonants. All the stops are unaspirated. The velar nasal occurs in all positions including at the beginning of a word.

Stress
Stress in Matigsalug always occurs penultimately, that is, on the second-to-last vowel. Because it is completely predictable, stress is not marked orthographically.

Matigsalug does have small one-syllable clitics. When these phonologically join to the previous word, they cause the stress to shift in order to maintain penultimate stress.

Morphosyntax

Noun phrases
Nouns are preceded by a case marker. There are three types of case markers in Matigsalug.

First, similar to the better-studied -marking in Tagalog, the language also employs a case-marking reserved for the noun with which the verb agrees (via focus/voice morphology). This marker exhibits allomorphy depending on whether the noun is a proper noun or a common noun.  is the allomorph used when the noun is a proper noun or a kinship term;  is used when the noun is a common noun or a possessive noun phrase.

Second, when the verb shows agreement with any other noun other than the agent/experiencer, the agent/experiencer is marked with a separate case marking. In other words, this would be comparable with the by-phrase in an English passive. This case marking also exhibits allomorphy depending on whether the agent/experiencer is a proper or a common noun.  is the allomorph used when the noun is a proper noun or a kinship term;  is used when the noun is a common noun or a possessive noun phrase.	

Lastly, there is case marking reserved for non-focused non-agent/experiencer roles in the clause. This case marking also exhibits allomorphy depending on whether the agent/experiencer is a proper or a common noun.  is the allomorph used when the noun is a proper noun or a kinship term;  is used when the noun is a common noun or a possessive noun phrase.

Focus/voice morphology
Characteristic of Philippine-type languages, Matigsalug verbs carry what is known in the literature as focus morphology. This piece of morphology indicates the semantic roles of the participants in the clause with respect to the verb. Matigsalug can put the agent/experiencer (AF), goal (GF), location (LF), and instrument (IF) into direct focus.

In the first example, the prefix eg- indicates that the ka-marked noun functions as the agent, that is, the entity doing the kicking. In the second example, the prefix eg- in combination with the suffix -en together indicate that the -marked noun is the goal, that is, the entity being kicked.

References

Sources

 

Manobo languages
Aeta languages
Languages of Bukidnon